Reiko Miyagi (27 May 1922 — 1 June 2008) was a Japanese tennis player of the 1950s and 1960s. She was the elder sister of grand slam doubles champion Atsushi Miyagi.

Miyagi was born in Ōta City, near the grounds of the Denen Coliseum where she trained. 

A four-time Asian Games gold medalist, Miyagi won a record 30 titles at the All Japan Championships across singles and doubles. Of those national titles she won 10 in singles, including eight in a row from 1956 to 1963.

In 1964 she was a member of Japan's first ever Federation Cup team and made the singles second round of that year's U.S. National Championships, losing to Billie Jean Moffitt.

Miyagi was the Japanese Federation Cup coach from 1978 to 1982.

References

External links
 
 

1922 births
2008 deaths
Japanese female tennis players
Sportspeople from Tokyo
Asian Games medalists in tennis
Asian Games gold medalists for Japan
Asian Games silver medalists for Japan
Asian Games bronze medalists for Japan
Medalists at the 1958 Asian Games
Medalists at the 1962 Asian Games
Medalists at the 1966 Asian Games
Tennis players at the 1958 Asian Games
Tennis players at the 1962 Asian Games
Tennis players at the 1966 Asian Games
20th-century Japanese women